The Beneteau First 25.7 is a French sailboat, that was designed by Group Finot and first built in 2004.

The First 25.7 is a development of the Beneteau First 260 Spirit and was developed into the Beneteau First 25S in 2008.

Production
The design was built by Beneteau in France and in the United States, but is now out of production.

Design
The First 25.7 is a recreational keelboat, built predominantly of fiberglass, with wood trim. It has a fractional sloop rig, a plumb stem, a vertical transom, dual transom-hung rudders controlled by a tiller and a centreboard or optional fixed fin keel. It displaces  and carries  of ballast.

See also
List of sailing boat types

Related development
Beneteau First 25S
Beneteau First 260 Spirit

Similar sailboats
Bayfield 25
C&C 25
Cal 25
Catalina 25
Catalina 250
Capri 25
Jouët 760
Kelt 7.6
Kirby 25
MacGregor 25
O'Day 25
Redline 25
Tanzer 25
US Yachts US 25

References

External links

Keelboats
2000s sailboat type designs
Sailing yachts
Sailboat type designs by Groupe Finot
Sailboat types built by Beneteau